1984 ACC tournament may refer to:

 1984 ACC men's basketball tournament
 1984 ACC women's basketball tournament
 1984 Atlantic Coast Conference baseball tournament